The Herzliya Museum of Contemporary Art is contemporary art museum.

History
The museum was established in 1965 in Herzeliya, Israel. The museum's main focus is on Israeli and international contemporary art. The museum building was designed by the architect Yaakov Rechter. The museum does not have a permanent collection, and hosts painting, sculpture, video, installation, photography and architecture exhibitions, as well as video installations and digital media exhibitions.

The museum has an educational program MUZA – A Place for Visual Experience. It holds different activities in the fields of video art and photography, including workshops and courses.

The museum is known for promotion of collaboration between Israeli and Palestinian artists by showing group exhibitions and organizing meetings and workshops for artists to work together. Herzliya Museum of Contemporary Art also exhibits art from different continents, showing works of artists who acclaimed in their countries but are not known well to the Western World.

Exhibitions
Among the artists exhibited in the museum are David Adika, Alona Rodeh, Shachar Freddy Kislev, Chien-Chi Chang, Hou Chun-Ming, Hsieh Ying-chun, Nira Pereg, Miki Kratsman, Sheffy Bleier, Ella Littwitz, Einat Arif-Galanti, Uri Gershuni, Olaf Breuning, Kendell Geers, Parastou Forouhar, Ilit Azoulay, Uriel Miron, Cliff Evans, Maya Zack and Aziz + Cucher.

See also 
 List of museums in Israel

References

External links 
Herzliya Museum of Contemporary Art

Art museums and galleries in Israel
Art museums established in 1965
Modern art museums
Contemporary art galleries in Israel
Herzliya
Museums in Tel Aviv District
1965 establishments in Israel
Yaakov Rechter buildings